The UEFA second round was contested by the best eight runners-up from the nine first round groups from the UEFA segment of the qualification tournament for the 2010 FIFA World Cup in football. The winners of each of four home and away ties joined the group winners in the World Cup in South Africa. The matches, which are often referred to as 'play-offs', were played on 14 and 18 November 2009. The draw for the ties was held in Zürich on 19 October, with the teams drawn by South African player Steven Pienaar.

Qualification

The eight best runners-up from the UEFA First Round qualified for the play-offs. With one group having one team fewer than the others, matches against the sixth-placed team in the group are not included in this ranking.

Seeding and draw

In September 2009, FIFA announced that they would be seeding teams for the play-off draw. The eight eventual qualifiers were seeded according to the world rankings released on 16 October 2009. The top four teams were placed into one pot, with the bottom four teams placed into a second. A separate draw was conducted between each matchup to decide the host of the first leg.

Seeding controversy

Seeding using FIFA ranks was used at a similar stage in the 2006 qualification. However, it was claimed that FIFA had indicated that there would be no seeding this time. At the time of the decision, countries in play-off positions included Russia, France and Portugal, and Germany also had not yet qualified (their last remaining match was away to Russia). The lack of a decision on seeding until late in the tournament led some to suggest that FIFA were waiting to see which teams were in the play-offs before declaring the rules of the tournament. Commenting on this matter, Republic of Ireland goalkeeper Shay Given said:
It’s totally unfair on us smaller nations. If they say that before a ball is kicked then at least you know the picture, you know exactly where you stand but to change it now is absolutely ridiculous and I don’t think it’s right at all.
Sports Illustrated's Gabriele Marcotti gave the opinion that "FIFA is pretty much changing the rules halfway through the qualifying tournament.Seedings
The eight teams were seeded according to the FIFA World Rankings released on 16 October (shown in parentheses in the table below).

Matches

|}France won 2–1 on aggregate.Ireland officially asked FIFA for the second leg to be replayed after Thierry Henry clearly handled the ball twice during the build-up to the French goal. This request was denied. Ireland eventually pursued legal action against FIFA over the decision before ultimately receiving a €5 million settlement.Portugal won 2–0 on aggregate.Greece won 1–0 on aggregate.2–2 on aggregate; Slovenia won on away goals.''
After the game Russian fans followed the Republic of Ireland's lead. They demanded a replay of their World Cup qualification play-off against Slovenia on the official site of FIFA. However, there was not any reaction from FIFA on this event.

References

Play-offs
play
2009 in Republic of Ireland association football
2009 in Russian football
play
play
2009–10 in Bosnia and Herzegovina football
2009–10 in Ukrainian football
play
November 2009 sports events